Purita is both a given name and surname of Spanish origin. Notable people with the name include:

People with the surname:
Emiliano Purita (born 1997), Argentine professional footballer

People with the given name:
Purita Campos (1937–2019), Spanish comics artist and painter
Purita Kalaw Ledesma (1914–2005), Philippine writer and art critic
Purita Macapagal (died 1943), first wife of Philippine President Diosdado Macapagal

Spanish-language surnames
Spanish feminine given names